

The Valencian Library 

The Nicolau Primitiu Valencian Library (Spanish: Biblioteca Valenciana Nicolau Primitiu) is the autonomic library from the Comunidad Valenciana (Spain). It’s the head of the Valencian Library System and is constituted as the superior library centre of the Generalitat and basic bibliographic deposit of the Comunidad Valenciana. 
Its mission is to: collect, preserve and disseminates the bibliographic Valencian heritage and all its printed collection, audio and visual, of the Comunidad Valenciana. It’s in charge of disseminating bibliographic information about the Valencian editorial production, and it creates a collective catalogue of bibliographic Comunidad Valenciana legacy.

History 
Its origins lie in a donation by the library of D. Nicolau Primitiu Gómez Serrano in 1979, in which the library acquired a book collection that is integrated by incunabula and editions of the 16th, 17th and 18th centuries, all of them part of the Historical Spanish Heritage, everything for the Nicolau Primitiu library in the city of Valencia.
This library summarizes the basic principles of a national library to gather works from Valencian authors, Valencian themed or produced in Valencia at the beginning. This initial donation was enriched by many more works which enlarged and completed those important documentaries. So, the Biblioteca Valenciana was created as a superior library centre of the Generalitat and basic bibliographic repository of the Comunidad Valenciana, dependent of the Consellería competent in culture.

Since its creation until 2000, the library was in the ancient building of the ‘Hospital General’, sharing its space with the Public Provincial Library of Valencia, while a new plot was being found. In 1995, the Generalitat decided that the permanent seat would be the ‘San Miguel de los Reyes’ Monastir, and after a hard rehabilitation project (between 1995 and 1999), in 2000 it was established as the seat. 
In 2010 it changed its name for Biblioteca Valenciana Nicolau Primitiu.

Funds 
The Valencian Library is in custody of almost a million documents and has an automatized and searchable catalogue for making queries on the Internet. The large collection is made up of several materials and supports, from parchment and paper, to the new electronic supports, and includes documents since the XIII age until the XXI age, all Valencian authors’ works, Valencian themed and produced in Valencia. The donations and legacies deserve special mention since it has allowed the library to form such a numerous and complete collection that is highly valued as a reference collection for researchers.

Apart from the initial donation from Nicolau Primitiu Gómez Serrano, funding for the library includes: the ones which correspond to Pere Maria Orts i Bosch, Ignacio Soldevila, Jesús Martínez Guerricabeitia, Familia Ventura, Guillermina Medrano y Rafael Supervía, Pedro Nácher, and more.
Also, it is essential the entry of works from the legal deposit and has some temporal deposits, which highlight the Colección Cervantina de Francesc Martínez i Martínez, representing one of the principal recuperations of the Cervantes’s works worldwide.
The Biblioteca Valenciana has furthermore and important manuscript collections which include the most ancient document in this Library, the municipal charter of Sant Mateu from 1274, and a magnificent collection of ancient funds with 53 volumes of incunabula and works from the XVI age until the XVIII age.
On the other hand, it’s important to highlight the importance of the Hemeroteca Collection, with more than 14,000 titles ranging from writing to graphic comic press, and the graphic collection is remarkable too.

Libraries in Spain